Salilacibacter albus is a species of bacteria from the family of Glycomycetaceae. Salilacibacter albus has been isolated from soil from a dried salt lake in China.

References

Actinomycetia
Bacteria described in 2016
Monotypic bacteria genera